This is a list of Arkansas-Pine Bluff Golden Lions football players in the NFL Draft.

Key

Selections

References

Arkansas-Pine Bluff

Arkansas-Pine Bluff Golden Lions NFL Draft